Lola, érase una vez (English: Lola, Once Upon a Time), is a youth-targeted Mexican telenovela produced by Televisa that is remake of the Argentine global popularity and teen telenovela Floricienta. The show tells the story of a modern Cinderella, Lola, who works as a nanny and sings in a rock band and meets her so-called Prince Charming (Aaron Diaz). It debuted in Mexico on February 26, 2007, starring Aarón Díaz and Eiza González, and was produced by Pedro Damián.

Plot 
The modern fairy tale takes place in Mexico City and revolves around Lola, a poor but ambitious Mexican girl. Lola's life changes when she meets Alexander Von Ferdinand, the oldest son of a very rich German Mexican family whose parents died in an accident. Alexander is the head of the family and has five younger siblings (Marcos, Archibaldo, Marion, Boris & Otto) living with him in a huge mansion (Palace).

While Alexander is in a trip to Germany, he leaves his younger siblings at home with their nanny. The siblings throw a party, inviting Lola and her band to play. A bubble machine soon breaks and fills the house with bubbles. Suddenly, Alexander unexpectedly returns to his home in Mexico. The invited teenagers flee the party, including the band, but Lola goes back into the house to rescue the youngest sibling, Otto, who is only six years old. Lola is covered with foam, hiding her face. Otto is returned to his older siblings and Alexander asks Lola to stop, but she runs from the mansion leaving one of her "lucky" pink converse (glass slippers) behind.

Sometime later, Otto once again gets Lola in trouble by hiding in the back of her motorcycle. As an apology, Alexander offers Lola a job as an assistant nanny in the Von Ferdinand mansion. Alexander has a cold personality until he falls in love with Lola. Upon meeting her, he becomes her "Prince Charming". Alexander has a girlfriend, Carlota, whom he does not truly love and feels obligated to marry because of social status. Carlota at the same time does not truly love him, wants Alexander's money, cheats and deceives him. Along with Carlota comes her wicked & recent widowed mother, Monserrat, and her more pleasant sister, Rafaela. Alexander's siblings hate Carlota and her mother and are constantly doing mischief to get them out of the mansion and prevent Carlota from marrying their older brother.

Lola and Alexander are in middle love with each other, but Carlota and Monserrat try to get in the way of their relationship. Together these two also attempt to keep Lola from finding out she is really the stepdaughter of Monserrat and halfsister of Carlota and Rafaela, which means she has a claim to part of the Santo Domingo fortune. Lola, with help of the children, her rock band, magic, fairies and love attempt to "save" Alexander from Carlota and Monserrat and vice versa.

Cast

Main 
 Aarón Díaz as Alexander Von Ferdinand
 Eiza González as Dolores "Lola" Pescador Valente/Dolores "Lola" Santodomingo Valente
 Grettell Valdez as Carlota Santodomingo Torres-Oviedo/Carlota santodomingo de von ferdinand
 Lorena Herrera as Monserrat Torres-Oviedo de Santodomingo

Recurring

Special guest stars 
 Christopher von Uckermann as Himself
 Maite Perroni as Herself / Cenicienta
 Enrique Rocha as Dios
 Xavi Moderatto as Himself
 Dulce María as Herself
 Anahí as Herself
 Brian Amadeus Moderatto as Himself
 Altair Jarabo as Catherine
 Alfonso Herrera as Himself
 Eleazar Gómez as Adrián
 Christian Chávez as Himself

Awards and nominations

Soundtrack
Lola, Erase Una Vez was the only Floricienta remake not to use the original songs penned by Cris Morena and Carlos Nilson. Instead, a double CD was released with songs written and composed by Mexican pop songwriters in one album and nine new Cris Morena-penned songs in another, along with a rock version of Flores Amarilla that was included in the original soundtrack.

The show's theme song is "Masoquismo" ("Masochism"). Other songs include "Si Me Besas" (If You Kiss Me), Espiral (Spiral), Princesa(Princess) and Sapo Azul(Prince Charming). In March 2009, González won New Artist/Revelation of the Year at the Premio Lo Nuestro Awards. González was nominated for Best New Artist at the Premios Oye!. Gonzalez also performed in 2008 in los premios juventud.

References

External links
 

2007 telenovelas
2007 Mexican television series debuts
2008 Mexican television series endings
Mexican telenovelas
Televisa telenovelas
Children's telenovelas
Teen telenovelas
Mexican television series based on Argentine television series
Spanish-language telenovelas
Television series about teenagers